René Araou (18 October 1902 – 8 January 1955) was a French rugby union player who competed in the 1924 Summer Olympics. He was born in Narbonne. In 1924 he won the silver medal as member of the French team.

References

External links
 
 
 
 

1902 births
1955 deaths
People from Narbonne
French rugby union players
France international rugby union players
Olympic rugby union players of France
Rugby union players at the 1924 Summer Olympics
Olympic silver medalists for France
Medalists at the 1924 Summer Olympics
Sportspeople from Aude
Rugby union locks
Rugby union props